The 1983 Philippine Basketball Association (PBA) Reinforced Filipino Conference was the second conference of the 1983 PBA season. It started on May 15 and ended on August 23, 1983. The tournament is an Import-laden format, which requires an import with the height limit of 6"5' and below for each team.

Format
The following format will be observed for the duration of the conference:
 Double-round eliminations; 14 games per team; Teams are then seeded by basis on win–loss records.
 The two teams at the bottom of the standings after the elimination round will be eliminated. The top two teams will advance outright to the semifinals. 
 The next four teams will qualify in a single round robin quarterfinals; The top two teams will advance to the semifinals. 
 Semifinals will be a double round robin affair with the four remaining teams.
 The top two teams in the semifinals advance to the best-of-five finals. The last two teams dispute the third-place trophy in a best-of-five playoff.

Elimination round

Quarterfinal berth playoff

Quarterfinals

Semifinals

Second seed playoff

Third place playoffs

Finals

References

PBA Reinforced Conference
Reinforced Filipino Conference